Jishui is a county located on the Gan River in Ji'an city, Jiangxi province, China.

The local speech is a variety of Gan Chinese.

The government of Jishui is located in Wenfeng town.

History
Jishui has 1,300 years of history. It became a county during the Sui dynasty.
There are many famous people from here, such as Ouyang Xiu, Yang Wanli (Song dynasty), Xie Jin (Ming dynasty), Luo Hongxian (Ming dynasty). The first Chinese map is made by Luo Hongxian who is from Jishui Futian.

Climate

Economy
Jiahui is a regional hub for agricultural production in Jiangxi Province. Products such as rice and oranges are economic staples. Jishui is a center for the production of traditional gloves, for which it ranks first in Jiangxi province in export value. The GDP of Jishui county in 2005 was 370 million Yuan.

Transportation

Rail
Jishui has extensive railway infrastructure which connects to many important cities in other provinces, including Beijing, Wuhan, Shenzhen, Shangqiu and Fuyang The Beijing-Jiulong Railway was built in 1997. Jishui Railway station is operated by Nanchang Bureau of Railways.

Beijing-Jiulong Railway

Air
Jinggangshan Airport,  built in 2004, is the main airport. It is situated in Taihe County, 50 kilometres north of the CBD. The airport is connected to major mainland cities such as Beijing, Shanghai, Guangzhou, and Shenzhen.

Road
The road transport infrastructure in Jishui is extensive. There are national highways that goes through Jishui. It is the No. 105 National roads No. 105 from Beijing to Zhuhai. Ganyue Expressway entrance is from the CDB.
Ganyue Expressway
China National Highway 105

An important development is the building of the Jishui Gan River Bridge, connecting the east and west banks of the Gan River. The project started in 2001 and was completed in 2004. The total investment was 117 million RMB.
The Jishui Gan River Bridge was built to connect the 105 National Highway and Guanyue Expressway, and it also ends the history of ferrying between the East and West.

Water

Tourism
Attractions in Jishui include Yanfang Ancient Village, Dadongshan, and Taohua Island.

Administration
Under its direct administration it has 14 towns and 3 townships.  The county government is located in Wenfeng.

14 Towns

3 Townships
Shangxian Township
Shuitian Township
Guanshan Township

References

External links
 Ji'an Jishui County Government Web (Chinese)

 
County-level divisions of Jiangxi